This article lists the notable gangs, security threat groups, criminal enterprises and related syndicates which participate in organized crime within various parts of Canada. Some of these organizations are based elsewhere (in other countries), but have members, chapters and/or operations set up in Canada.

Multiracial groups

The 1%ers Syndicate/Cartel, in Winnipeg (multicultural, Indo-Caribbean, Caucasian, Asian, black, native)
Bacon Brothers – Red Scorpions (Formerly a member of the Wolfpack Gang Alliance)
EOA (East of Adelaide) – A conglomerate of street gangs and individuals involved in the narcotics trade based in the east end of London, Ontario. These neighborhood gangs are linked together by London Police Service into a single entity known as EOA due to the fact that they are mostly all connected to the same supplier. The city's largest organized crime group as a whole.
First Division – London, Ontario based street gang
Five Point Generalz
H-Block – London, Ontario based street gang
Kipps Lane Crew (KLC) – London, Ontario based street gang. Operates in the North-east of London.
Ledbury-Banff Crips
Mongrel Mob – 1 chapter in Montreal
Ontario Wide Crew (OWC) – Provincial-wide organized group operating out of London, Ontario.
Red Scorpions (Formerly a member of the Wolfpack Gang Alliance)
Ugly Gang – Peterborough, based street gang involved in money laundering, taxation of other groups in the area involved in the narcotics trade.
United Nations gang – Primarily Caucasian, Asian, Indo-Canadian, and Persian (member of the Dhak-Dhure-UN Alliance)

Aboriginal-based

Crazy Cree
Crazy Indian Nomads
Crypts
Death Do Us Part
Deuce
Hustle Crew
Indian Posse – Canada's largest organized crime group as a whole.
Kelowna Warriors
Manitoba Warriors – Winnipeg based street gang.
Mixed Blood
Most Organized Brothers (a.k.a. MOB)
Native Syndicate
Native Syndicate Killers
Redd Alert
Ruthless Posse
Saskatchewan Warriors – Saskatoon based street gang.
Terror Squad
Tribal Brotherz
West End Boys
West Side Soldiers
West Side Outlawz

Black/African-Canadian

Afrikan Mafia
All Crips Gang
Bay Mills Crips
Bo-Gars
Dawes Road Bloods
Dixon Bloods (Somali Canadians)
Driftwood Crips
Dynamic Crew
Eastside 187 Homicide Bloods
Eastside Disciples Crips
Eastside Mafia Crips
East Side Orton Park Bloods
Falstaff Crips
G-Siders
Galloway Boys
Gangster Disciples
Ghetto Boys
Ghetto Soldiers Crips
Glendower Crips
Jamestown (Doomstown) Crips
Jungle City Goonz
Jungle Posse
Lakeshore Crips
Mad Cowz
Mother Nature's Mistakes
Mount Olive Crips
New Born Crips
Nigerian mafia
North Preston's Finest
North Side Chalkfarm Bloods
O-Blocc Crips
Oriole Crescent Crips
Overbrook Crips
Pirus
Project Originals
Queens Drive Crips
Rexdale Bloods
Tandridge Crips
Tongan Crip Gang
Trethewey Gangster Crips
Vaughan Road Bloods 
M.O.B. Klick
Vice Lords
Uzi Crew Crips
Westside Bloodz

Caribbean
Crackdown Posse – A Crip set in Montreal with members of mostly Haitian origin
Downtown Posse – A Montreal Crip gang in Cote-des-Neiges. Mostly of Jamaican origin.
Jamaican posse – Has a significant base of operations in the city of Toronto
Shower Posse – Operates in the Canadian province of Ontario 
Uptown Posse – A Montreal Blood gang in Cote-des-Neiges. Mostly of Afroamerican and Jamaican origin.

Eastern Asian, Triads and Tongs

14K (triad) (Chinese)
Asian Assassinz (Chinese/Vietnamese)
Bahala Na Gang (Filipino)
Bamboo Union
Big Circle Gang (Chinese)
Born to Kill (gang) (Vietnamese)
F.O.B. Killers
Fresh Off the Boat
Luen Group
Leun Kung Lok
Shui Fong (Chinese)
Sun Yee On (Chinese)
Tiny Rascal Gang (Cambodian)
Wo Shing Wo (Chinese/Vietnamese)
Yakuza
Yellow Triangle Boys

White and white supremacist

856 gang
Aryan Nations – Canadian brand of a white supremacist group established in 1974, one of their Canadian leaders, Camey Nerland was sentenced to prison after he pled guilty for killing a native American, seen as a part of the Canadian Brotherhood.
Aryan Guard – Radical white nationalist organization involved in hate crimes and pipe bombings, and is believed to be active again.
Aggravated Resistance
Albanian mafia
Canadian Liberty Net (CLN) – Canadian white nationalist organization located on the West Coast, the group went to trial in 1992, due to its treatment of Jews and "non-whites".
Canadian Brotherhood – Canadian Neo-Nazi group, Canadian branch of the Aryan Brotherhood, active in Canadian prison system
Greek mafia
Irish Mob
Jimmy Cournoyer Syndicate – Known as the King of Pot, responsible for creating a multibillion-dollar international narcotics trafficking empire.
Légion Nationaliste – Radical white power skinhead group
Marriott Crime Family – Nova Scotia based crime family, participant in the "Spryfield War"
Melvin Crime Family – Nova Scotia based crime family, participant in the "Spryfield War"  
Northern Order – A Neo-Nazi terrorist organisation involved in organized crime
Romanian mafia
Russian mafia
Soldiers of Odin – An anti-immigrant group with 8 chapters in Canada
Solntsevskaya Bratva
Black Shirts Gang (BSG)– London, Ontario based Neo-Nazi group
The Base – International Neo-Nazi white supremacist group
The Loyal White Knights of the Ku Klux Klan – A branch of the KKK operating in Canada.
West End Gang
White Aryan Resistance (WAR) – began recruiting and created chapters in Canada with operation Maple leaf in 1993.
White Boy Posse – Violent white supremacist gang
Q.A.R.M (Queens Anne's Revenge) – London, Ontario - mostly white - street gang - violent - some members support hells angels

Hispanic

18th Street Gang (Mainly Mexicans, Salvadorans, Hondurans, Guatemalans)
Batos Locos – Also known as Vatos Locos
Jalisco New Generation Cartel
Latin Kings (Puerto Rican, Mexican, and other Latinos)
Los Zetas (cartel)
MS-13
Ñetas (Puerto Rican)
Sinaloa Cartel
Sur 13 (Mexican)

Italian-Canadian

Bonanno crime family – One of the Five Families.
Coluccio crime family
Commisso 'ndrina
Cotroni crime family
Cuntrera-Caruana Mafia clan
DeMaria crime family
Figliomeni crime family
Luppino crime family
Musitano crime family
Papalia crime family
Rizzuto crime family – Also known as the Sixth Family.
Ruso crime family
Siderno Group
Tavernese crime family
Stefanini crime family

Middle Eastern 
 Lebanese mafia
 Kurish Pride – London, Ontario

Outlaw motorcycle clubs

Note: Five largest motorcycle clubs in Canada have chapters listed.
Bacchus Motorcycle Club (5th)
Chapters/Charters (15 total in Canada)
New Brunswick
Albert County (Mother Chapter)
York County
St. John
Charlotte County
Newfoundland
Grand Falls Windsor
C.B.S (Conception Bay South)
Nova Scotia
Halifax
Colchester
Hants County (Frozen)
Route 333 (Frozen)
Ontario
Hamilton
Chatham
Sudbury
Halton Hill
Muskoka
Prince Edward Island
Kings County
Prince County
Bacchus MC support clubs
Mountain Men Rednecks MC

Black Diamond Riders MC
Black Hawks Motorcycle Club
Condemned MC
Freewheelers MC
Gladiators MC

Hells Angels (1st)
Chapters/Charters (44 total in Canada)
Alberta
Edmonton
Calgary
Southland
Westridge
Hellside
Alberta Nomads (Red Deer)
British Columbia
Vancouver
White Rock
Nanaimo
Haney
Mission City
Hardside
Kelowna
West Point
British Columbia Nomads
New Brunswick
New Brunswick Nomads
Nova Scotia (Prospective)
Musquodoboit Harbour (Frozen)
Ontario
Keswick
Oshawa
London
Kitchener
Simcoe County
Toronto
Toronto North
Toronto East
Toronto West
Woodbridge
Niagara
Hamilton
Windsor
Brandford
Brooklin
Ontario Nomads (Ottawa)
Toronto South (former Para-dice Riders, merged with other Toronto chapters)
Toronto Downtown (former Last Chance MC, merged with other Toronto chapters)
Prince Edward Island
Charlottetown
Quebec
Montreal (First Chapter in Canada)
Montreal South
Sherbrooke
Quebec City
Trois Riviéres
Quebec Nomads
Laval (Aka. Montreal North, Frozen)
Manitoba
Winnipeg
Manitoba Nomads
Saskatchewan
Saskatoon
Regina
Hells Angels support clubs
103 Riders MC
Archrivals Motorcycle Club
Bad Disciples MC
Chain Breakers MC
Darksiders MC
Devils Army
Devils Ghosts
Dirty Few Motorcycle Club
Family Jammin' MC
Gate Keepers Motorcycle Club – 6 chapters in Canada
Highlanders MC – 3 chapters in Nova Scotia 
Horseman Brotherhood
Iron Dragons MC
Katt Sass MC
Longhorns MC
Los Desperados MC
Minotaures MC
Malicious MC
Missiles Motorcycle Club
Niners MC
Red Devils Motorcycle Club – 8 chapters in Canada
Redline Motorcycle Club
Savage MC
Sedition MC
Shadow Club MC
Stolen Souls Motorcycle Club
Syndicate Motorcycle Club
Throttle Kings MC
Throttle Rockers MC
Tribal Motorcycle Club
Vikings Motorcycle Club
Unforgiven MC

Iron Order Motorcycle Club – 6 chapters in Canada.
Iron Legacy MC – 2 chapters in Canada
Last Chance MC

Loners Motorcycle Club (4th)
Chapters/Charters (16 total in Canada)
World-wide/National
LMC International Nomads chapter
LMC Canada Nomads chapter
Nova Scotia
LMC Fredericton chapter
Ontario
LMC Woodbridge chapter (Mother chapter)
LMC Amherstburg chapter
LMC Richmond Hill chapter
LMC Stratford chapter
LMC Hamilton chapter
LMC Peterborough chapter
LMC Vaughan chapter 
LMC Brockville chapter 
LMC Toronto chapter 
LMC Halton Hills chapter
LMC Cornwall chapter (Frozen)
LMC Windsor chapter (Frozen)
LMC London chapter (Frozen)
LMC Chatham chapter (Frozen)
LMC Lindsay chapter (Frozen)
Alberta
LMC Edmonton chapter
LMC Edmonton North chapter (Frozen)
Quebec
LMC Montreal chapter (Frozen)
Saskatchewan 
LMC Saskatoon chapter
LMC Swift Current chapter
LMC Regina chapter (Frozen)
Loners support clubs
Annihilators Motorcycle Club(1997-1999)
Dirty Dozen MC

Los Montoneros – Support/puppet club for the more well-known Bandidos Motorcycle Club
Mongols Motorcycle Club – 1 chapter in Canada
Moors Motorcycle Club – 2 chapters in Quebec

Outlaws Motorcycle Club (2nd)
Chapters/Charters (24 total in Canada)
Nation-Wide
Outlaws Nomads Canada
Alberta
Edmonton
Calgary
British Columbia
Kelowna
New Brunswick
Fredericton
Woodstock
Newfoundland
Bishop Falls
Grand Falls Windsor
Nova Scotia
Cape Breton
Ontario
Cornwall
Kingston
London
Ottawa
Ottawa South Side
Peterborough
Sault Ste. Marie
Sudbury
South Simcoe
St. Catherines
Trenton
Toronto
Hastings
Toronto East (Toronto South / East merge)
Toronto South (Toronto East / South merge)
Woodstock (Frozen)
Hamilton (Frozen)
Quebec
Montreal (Frozen)
Montreal South (Frozen)
Danville (Frozen)
Saskatchewan
Midlands
Outlaws MC support clubs
Black Pistons Motorcycle Club – 2 chapters in Canada 
Dead Eyes MC
Filthy 15 Motorcycle Club

Para-dice Riders Motorcycle Club
Queensmen Motorcycle Club – 3 chapters in Canada
Rebels Motorcycle Club – 3 chapters in Canada

Rock Machine (3rd)
Chapters/Charters (21 total in Canada)
World-wide/Country-wide
RMMC International Nomads
RMMC Nomads Canada
RMMC Militia Nomads chapter
RMMC Infantry Nomads chapter
Alberta 
Edmonton
Calgary
Medicine Hat (Death Valley chapter)
Lethbridge
British Columbia
Vancouver
New Brunswick
Saint John
RMMC 506 chapter (506 Crew)
Ontario
Windsor
Kawartha (Vengeance chapter)
Huron County (Redemption chapter)
Quebec
Montreal (Original Mother chapter)
Sherbrooke (Current Mother chapter)
Quebec City
Trois-Rivières
Dead City chapter (Chapter 13)
Manitoba
Winnipeg (Murder-Peg chapter)
Saskatchewan
Regina (Psycho City chapter)
Rock Machine MC support clubs
The Palmers MC
Fearless Bandits MC
Hell Hounds MC
New Blood MC
SS Elite Motorcycle Club
Vendettas Motorcycle Club – 6 chapters in Canada

Salty Souls MC
Satan's Choice Motorcycle Club (NEW 2017) – 2 chapters in Canada
Satudarah Motorcycle Club – 1 chapter in Canada
Sin City Deciples
Sons of Satan MC – Support/puppet club for the more well-known Pagan's Motorcycle Club
Vagabonds MC
Vagos Motorcycle Club – 2 chapters in Canada
Vagos MC support clubs
Loki Warriors MC
Warlocks Motorcycle Club – 2 chapters in Canada

Punjabi-Canadian

Brothers Keepers Gang – Gang active across Canada, Washington state and Minnesota (apart of the Wolfpack Gang Alliance)
Dhak-Dhure Crime Groups Coalition
Dhaliwal Crime Family – Decades old organized crime group active across Ontario, Quebec, Michigan and New York state with international criminal ties
Independent Soldiers Gang – Decades old organized crime gang active across Canada (apart of the Wolfpack Gang Alliance)
Kang Crime Group – Also known as "BIBO gang" or "Blood In, Blood Out gang" (formerly a member of the Wolfpack Alliance)
Malli-Buttar Crime Groups Coalition
Punjabi mafia
The Ruffians gang
Sanghera crime family

Unknown ethnic makeup
FU Crew – London, Ontario based street gang that started a war with the London charter of the Hells Angels in 2012, affiliates of the Outlaws Motorcycle Club.
Hustle Crew
Sic Thugz
Soul Suvivaz
Southside Kings
Southside Queens
Unknown Soldiers gang
Westside Outlaws
White Oaks Crew – London, Ontario based street gang, operates on the Southwest side of the city
Young Buck Killas

Defunct organized crime groups

Black
Eglinton West Crips – Alleged by authorities to have been dismantled in 2020 following Project Sunder, a year-long law enforcement probe.

Caribbean
The Gatorz (Defunct) 
Junior Gatorz (Defunct)

Hispanic
MS-13 (Central Americans) – There was a small faction of MS-13 documented in Toronto in the 2010s. The gang operated in the Jane-Woolner area. It is largely believed to be defunct at this point. There are no MS-13 remaining in Canada that operate along ethnic lines, though other multicultural gangs (i.e. the United Nations) may have Hispanics among their ranks.

Outlaw Motorcycle Clubs

13th Tribe Motorcycle Club – Absorbed by the Hells Angels in 1984.
Annihilators Motorcycle Club – An outlaw motorcycle group based in Richmond Hill, Ontario with members including Wayne Kellestine. Merged with the Loners Motorcycle Club in June 1999.
Atomes MC – Ultimately wiped out around 1984 by rival Sherbrooke biker gang, the Gitans.
Bandidos Motorcycle Club – The clubs single Canadian chapter merged with Rock Machine in the year 2001, they would operate in Canada until mid 2007.
Frozen Chapters/Charters (10 total formerly in Canada)
Alberta
Edmonton (Frozen)
Manitoba
Winnipeg (Frozen)
Ontario
Toronto (Frozen)
London (Frozen)
Kingston (Frozen)
Niagara Falls (Frozen)
Quebec
Montreal (Frozen)
Quebec City (Frozen)
Trois-Rivières (Frozen)
Beauport (Frozen)
Devil's Disciples Motorcycle Club – Quebec based Club that was allied with Satan's Choice, dissolved after Canada's first biker conflict with the Popeyes Motorcycle Club the event is known as the Satan's Choice-Popeyes War.
Death Riders MC – Former Hells Angels support club, was involved in the Quebec Biker War, now defunct.
Demons Keepers Motorcycle Club – a now defunct support club of the Hells Angels, that had chapters in Toronto, Cornwall and Ottawa.
Diablos Motorcycle Club – an outlaw motorcycle club run by Frank Lenti (Former member of the Loners MC) based in Ontario, dissolved and absorbed during Satan's Choice-Loners War with the Loners Motorcycle Club in 1995.
Evil Ones MC – Former Hells Angels support club, was involved in the Quebec Biker War, now defunct.
Foundation Motorcycle Club – A now defunct Ontario-based Hells Angels support club, that was active during the Ontario Biker War, it had chapters in Toronto, Hamilton and Oakville.
Ghost Riders Motorcycle Club – Alberta based gang, absorbed by the Grim Reapers Motorcycle Club (Canada) in November 1980.
Gitans MC – A Sherbrooke-based biker gang that patched over to the Hells Angels in 1984.
Golden Hawk Riders MC – Ontario based club that had violent altercations with Satan's Choice.
Grim Reapers Motorcycle Club (Canada) – An outlaw motorcycle group that had grown to become a dominant club in Western Canada during the 1980s and 1990s. "Patched-over" to the Hells Angels in 1997. Unrelated to the active US-based club of the same name.
Highway Kings MC – was dissolved in the 1980s
Holocaust Motorcycle Club – Was the club belonging to the infamous Canadian criminal, Wayne "Weiner" Kellestine before it patched over to the Annihilators Motorcycle Club in the 1990s.
Iron Hawgs Motorcycle Club – Toronto based Motorcycle Club that patched over to the Outlaws Motorcycle Club in 1984.
Jackels Motorcycle Club – London, Ontario and Montreal based support club of the Hells Angels, was a participant in the Ontario Biker conflict; now defunct.
Kings Crew Motorcycle Club – one of the dominant motorcycle clubs in Alberta during the 1980s and early 1990s, merged with the Hells Angels in late 1990's.
Lobos Motorcycle Club – Merged with the Hells Angels in 2001
Los Bravos – Patched over by the Hells Angels in 2000.
Montreal Rockers Motorcycle Club – Former Hells Angels support club created in 1992, it was involved in the Quebec Biker War, now defunct.
Mongols Motorcycle Club – Montreal based club, not to be confused with the more notable US based Mongols Motorcycle Club, patched over to Popeye Moto Club in 1974. 
No-Name Motorcycle Club – Also known as the "Not So Good-Looking Guys Club" was a Hamilton-based club, it was formed by African Canadian's when they were refused entry into the Outlaws MC, disbanded in late 70s when several members faced several charges
Original Red Devils Motorcycle Club – Formed in Hamilton, Ontario in 1948 making it Canada's oldest Outlaw motorcycle club. Patched over by Bacchus MC in 2014. Unrelated to the Red Devils Motorcycle Club, which also has a presence in Canada.
Popeyes Motorcycle Club – Notorious Québécois biker gang that eventually became absorbed by the Hells Angels in 1977 becoming its first chapter in Canada.
Rebels Motorcycle Club (Canada) – Western Canada-based biker gang active from 1968 until 2004 with a majority of their chapters patching over to the Hell's Angels in 1998. Not to be confused with the Australian club of the same name.
Rockers Motorcycle Club – Former Outlaws support club, based in Montreal, it eventually "Patched-over" to the Outlaws, giving them their second chapter in Montreal.
Satan's Choice Motorcycle Club – Was once the dominant motorcycle club in Canada, operating out of its stronghold in the province of Ontario during the 1970s and was the second largest motorcycle club in the World behind the Hell's Angels during this period, with a membership of over 400. However, in 1977 their influence began to diminish with some of the club's chapters "patching over" to the Outlaws MC in 1977. The remaining chapters would eventually become members of the Hells Angels along with most of the other major outlaw clubs in Ontario, with the club disbanded in 2000.
Frozen Chapters/Charters (16 total formerly in Canada)
Ontario
Scarborough (Frozen)
Mississauga (Frozen)
Cambridge (Frozen)
Oshawa (Frozen)
Toronto (Frozen)
London (Frozen)
Kingston (Frozen)
Thunder Bay (Frozen)
Richmond Hill (Frozen)
Hamilton (Frozen) 
St. Catherine (Frozen)
Sault St. Marie (Frozen)
Windsor (Frozen)
Ottawa (Frozen)
Kitchener (Frozen)
Quebec
Montreal (Frozen)
Satan's Angels Motorcycle Club – Patched-over to the Hells Angels in 1983, giving them their first chapters in British Columbia
The Spartans
The SS Motorcycle Club – white-supremacist motorcycle gang, former members include Maurice Boucher, Salvatore Cazzetta, and Normand "Biff" Hamel (Hell's Angels).
The Wild Ones – Gang disbanded around 1978 during the First Biker War.
Warlords Motorcycle Club – "Patched-over" to Rebels Motorcycle Club (Canada) in 1983 after being defeated in Riverdale by the Rebels MC

Multiracial
Dark Circle – Montreal Quebec based criminal organization, it was a participant in the Quebec Biker War.
Pelletier Clan – Montreal Quebec based street gang, it was a participant in the Quebec Biker War.
Westmount Crew – London, Ontario based street gang.
Bono Boyz/Bono Hood – London, Ontario based street gang.

South Asian
VVT

White

Boyd Gang – Former infamous criminal organization based in Toronto.
Dömötör-Kolompár criminal organization – Hungarian crime family that ran a human trafficking syndicate, lasting until 2010.
Dubois Brothers – French-Canadian crime group in Montreal that was active up until the 1980s.
Heritage Front – Canadian neo-Nazi white supremacist organization founded in 1989 and disbanded around 2005.
Markham Gang – Historical criminal organization that was active in the middle of the 19th century.
Shiner (Ottawa) – Historical gangs of Irish immigrants in Ottawa.
The Stopwatch Gang – Trio of Canadian bank bandits who robbed banks in both Canada and the United States.
Tri-City Skins – White power skinhead gang from Ontario that disbanded in 2002.

See also
Gangs in Canada
Organizations designated as terrorist by Canada

References 

Gangs